Oblivskaya is a rural locality (a stanitsa) in Oblivsky District of Rostov Oblast, Russia. Population:   It is also the administrative center of Oblivsky District.

History 

It is believed that the khutor of Oblivy was first settled by cossacks in 1744. In 1838 the settlement had 42 households.

The original territory of the khutor was surrounded by Chir River and several lakes. In spring, during the floods, the territory of the farm was fenced off from the land with water, and sometimes the village itself used to become flooded. Over time the village was moved up to the hill. As of 1879, there were 80 households there. 

In the 1860s, a Chapel was built here and later a parish school began to function, in which natural sciences, handicrafts, exact sciences, French and German languages were taught. In 1881 a post office was established here.

Before Russian Revolution of 1917 the stanitsa had a population of about 1500 people.

During World War II Oblivskaya was a place of fightings. It was briefly occupied by Germans and later liberated on 31st of December, 1942.

Places of interest 
 Museum of local history
 St. Nicholas' Church, an architectural monument of the 19th century and an object of cultural heritage of Russia.

References

Rural localities in Rostov Oblast